Hamid BouHamdan (born 13 March 1989 in Dezful) is an Iranian footballer who currently plays for Tractor.

Club career

Naft Tehran
Hamid moved to Naft Tehran in 2013 and played for the club in Iran Pro League. Hamid started his debut in a 0–1 victory over Fajr Sepasi in a league match.

Naft Masjed Soleyman
Hamid came back to Naft Masjed Soleyman for one year on a loan deal on 5 January 2014. He is used as a starting 11 after his great performance.

Club career statistics

Honours
Naft Masjed Soleyman
Azadegan League (1): 2013–14

Foolad
Iranian Super Cup: 2021

References

Naft Masjed Soleyman FC at Soccerway

Iranian footballers
1989 births
Living people
People from Dezful
Naft Tehran F.C. players
Foolad FC players
Zob Ahan Esfahan F.C. players
Association football midfielders
Sportspeople from Khuzestan province